2009 Virginia Cavaliers baseball team represented the University of Virginia in the 2009 NCAA Division I baseball season.  The Cavaliers played their home games at Davenport Field. The team was coached by Brian O'Connor, leading his sixth season at Virginia.

The Cavaliers won the 2009 Atlantic Coast Conference baseball tournament, then advanced to the 2009 College World Series.

Personnel

Roster

Coaches

Schedule

Ranking movements

References

Virginia Cavaliers baseball seasons
Virginia
Atlantic Coast Conference baseball champion seasons
College World Series seasons
Virginia
Virgin